The Postcard Killings is a 2020 American crime film directed by Danis Tanović, starring Jeffrey Dean Morgan, Famke Janssen and Cush Jumbo, and based on the 2010 novel The Postcard Killers by James Patterson and Liza Marklund. The film was released on March 13, 2020, receiving negative reviews from critics.

Plot 
Jacob Kanon, a New York detective, investigates the death of his daughter who was murdered while on her honeymoon; he recruits the help of an American journalist working in Sweden, Dessie Lombard, when other couples throughout Europe suffer a similar fate.

The movie opens with someone killing a young couple. It turns out to be Jacob Kanon's daughter and her husband who are in London on their honeymoon. He goes to London to identify the bodies of his daughter and her new husband at the morgue.

After that Kanon starts investigating on who's the killer and moves to other European cities as the killer doesn't stop. With the help of Lombard and a German policeman he exposes the truth and understands what's going on.

Cast 
 Jeffrey Dean Morgan as Jacob Kanon 
 Famke Janssen as Valerie Kanon
 Cush Jumbo as Désirée “Dessie” Lombard
 Joachim Król as Inspector Klaus Bublitz
 Steven Mackintosh as Rupert Pearce
 Naomi Battrick as Sylvia Randolph / Marina Haysmith
 Ruairi O'Connor as Mac Randolph / Simon Haysmith
 Denis O'Hare as Simon Haysmith
 Eva Röse as DS Agneta Hoglund
 Lukas Loughran	as Detective Evert Ridderwall
 Dylan Devonald Smith as Pieter
 Sallie Harmsen as Nienke
 Orla O'Rourke as Nancy
 Christopher Pizzey as Charles Hardwick
 Tim Ahern as Bill Brown
 Martin Wenner as Matts
 Caroline Bartholdson as Female Detective
 Daniel Sjöberg as Male Detective
 Pål Espen M Kilstad as The Driver
 Ben Vinnicombe as Jose Martinez

Reception 
On Metacritic, the film has a weighted average score of 29 out of 100, based on 4 critics, indicating "generally unfavorable reviews".

Frank Scheck of The Hollywood Reporter wrote: "The filmmakers are clearly hoping that Patterson's name will be enough to attract moviegoers, but this misbegotten effort only serves to further tarnish a cinematic brand already diminished by 2012's Tyler Perry-starrer Alex Cross." Dennis Harvey of Variety said: "This uninspired detour into impersonally commercial English-language terrain for Bosnian director Danis Tanovic (an Oscar winner for 2001's No Man's Land) should provide Patterson's fans and undemanding miscellaneous viewers with an acceptably slick if not-particularly-suspenseful crime potboiler for home viewing." Brian Costello of Common Sense Media awarded the film three stars out of five.

References

External links 
 
 

2020 films
American crime drama films
American mystery films
British crime drama films
Films based on works by James Patterson
Films directed by Danis Tanović
2020s French-language films
2020s German-language films
2020s Russian-language films
2020s Swedish-language films
2020s English-language films
2020s American films
2020s British films